Karen S. Lynch (born December 30, 1963) is an American businesswoman and the president and chief executive officer of CVS Health. Lynch serves on the board of directors of AHIP, CVS Health, and U.S. Bancorp. In 2015, she became the first female president of Aetna. She has held executive positions at Magellan Health Services and Cigna. In 2021, she became the highest-ranking female chief executive on the Fortune 500 list.

Early life and education
Lynch was born on December 30, 1963, in Ware, Massachusetts. She attended Ware Junior/Senior High School and graduated in 1980. Lynch attended Carroll School of Management at Boston College, where she received a bachelor’s degree in Accounting and has a Certified Public Accountant (CPA) certification. Upon graduating, she started her financial career in the Boston office of Ernst & Young, where she specialized in insurance.

Career
Lynch credits her chosen career path in health care to her family life experiences. She spent nearly a decade in insurance before returning to graduate school to pursue her MBA, saying, "I wanted to broaden my financial background to have more exposure to the business aspects of running a company". In 2004, Lynch was appointed president of Cigna Dental. The following year, she was named to a newly-created position that combines leadership of Cigna Group Insurance and Cigna Dental. She left Cigna in 2009 to become president of Magellan Health Services.

Lynch stayed with Magellan until 2012, when she joined Aetna as executive vice president and head of Specialty Products. Three months after joining Aetna, Lynch led the integration of Coventry Health Care, which was the largest health care acquisition at the time. In 2015, Lynch became Aetna's first female president, a role she retained through the $70 billion acquisition of Aetna by CVS Health in 2018.
 
During the COVID-19 pandemic, Lynch took the helm as president and chief executive officer of CVS Health on February 1, 2021, following the retirement of Larry Merlo. The appointment made her the highest-ranking female CEO on the Fortune 500 list and the 40th female chief executive on the Fortune 500 list. Under Lynch's leadership, CVS Health administered the COVID-19 vaccine in more than 40,000 long-term care facilities and in CVS Pharmacy locations in 50 states, Puerto Rico and Washington, D.C.

Awards and honors
Lynch was selected for the inaugural 2021 Forbes 50 Over 50, a list of female entrepreneurs, leaders, scientists, and creators who are over the age of 50. She was awarded the 2021 Committee for Economic Development Distinguished Leadership Award, which recognizes business leaders for their contributions. Additionally, Lynch is a board member of U.S. Bancorp, AHIP, The Business Council, Boston College Women’s Council, The Business Roundtable, and is an advisory board member of IBM Watson Health. Lynch is also a trustee of the Bushnell Center for the Performing Arts.
 
She served as honorary co-chair of the Komen Connecticut Race for the Cure benefiting breast cancer research. In 2021, she was ranked number one on Fortune’s Most Powerful Women in Business list. Karen Lynch is the recipient of Hunt Scanlon’s 2022 “Excellence in Culture” Award.

Personal life
Lynch was raised by a single mother. Her mother died by suicide when Lynch was 12 years old. Following her mother’s death, Lynch and her three siblings were raised by their aunt. In Lynch’s early 20s, she lost her aunt to breast cancer, lung cancer, and emphysema.
 
Lynch is married to Kevin M. Lynch, the founder, president and CEO of the Quell Foundation, a non-profit organization whose mission is to remove the stigma around mental health, reduce the number of suicides, overdoses, and the incarceration of those with mental illness.

References

External Links
 Karen S. Lynch Biography

Living people
1963 births
American health care chief executives
American women business executives
Businesspeople from Massachusetts
Boston University alumni
Carroll School of Management alumni
American chief executives of Fortune 500 companies
21st-century American women